Clem is a French television series created by Emmanuelle Rey Magnan and Pascal Fontanille, and directed by Joyce Buñuel and Éric Leroux.

Synopsis 
"Clem" retraces the life of a young teenage girl, Clementine, mom at sixteen, in the heart of tensions between her parents and Julien, Valentin's father, her child. It includes the problems of teenage life and that of a mother with a strong personality.

Cast and characters

Main cast 

 Lucie Lucas as Clémentine "Clem" Boissier (since season 1)
 Victoria Abril as Caroline "Caro" Boissier (season 1 to 8)
 Jean Dell as Michel Brimont (since season 1)
 Carole Richert as Marie-France Brimont (since season 1)
 Élodie Fontan as Alyzée (season 1 to 9)
  as Hicham (since season 1)
  as Jérôme (season 3 to 7)
 Philippe Lellouche as Xavier Ferran (season 5 to 8)
 Thomas Chomel as Valentin "Vava" Boissier-Brimont (since season 9)
 Léa Lopez as Salomé "Mémé" Boissier (season 6 to 9)

Former main cast 

 Mathieu Spinosi as Julien Brimont, Valentin's father (season 1 to 4)
 Laurent Gamelon as Jean-Paul "JP" Boissier (season 2 to 5)
  as Jean-Paul Boissier (season 1 to 2)
 Jade Pradin as Salomé "Mémé" Boissier (season 1 to 5)
  as Manie (season 1)
 Thomas Ancora as Paul (season 3 to 6)
 Louise Petit Damico as Anouchka Ferran (season 5 to 6)
 Rayane Bensetti as Dimitri Ferran (season 5 to 7)

Actors who played Valentin 

 Diane and Robin Weiller (season 1)
 Marceau Cathelineau (season 1)
 Jules and Lucas Josso (season 2)
 Jean Daudigny (season 3)
 Thomas Moissonnier (season 3)
 Paul Monate (season 3 to 4)

Former high school characters 

  as Mathieu (season 2)
  as Stanislas "Stan" (season 1 to 2)
 Emma Gamet as Gladys (season 1 to 2)
 Nina Ambard as Léna Ducovitch (season 1 to 2)
 Annie Grégorio as Mlle Lecoutre (season 1 to 2)
 Sandra Dorset as Delphine Roussel (season 4 to 5)

Recurring cast 

 Agustín Galiana as Adrian Moron (since season 6)
  as Solange (since season 2)
 Dominique Fouré as Mme Fliponot (since season 3)
 Ulysse Pillon as Martin (since season 3)
 Emmanuelle Bach as Vic (since season 3)
 Johanna Nizard as Sabine (since season 3)
  as Sarah (since season 4)
  as Lila (since season 4)
  as Max (since season 5)
 Marie Arnaudy as Babeth (since season 5)
 Joyce Bibring as Marjorie (since season 5)
 Victor Meutelet as Lucas (since season 5)
 Laura Giudice as Laura (since season 5)

Former recurring cast 

  as a teacher (season 1)
  as M. Dumas (season 1 to 4)
 Arnaud Binard as Bruno (season 1 to 2)
 Camille Chamoux as Valérie (season 1 to 3)
 Claudia Tagbo as the day care's director (season 2)
  as Jean-Jacques Boissier (season 2 to 4)
 Émilie Gavois-Kahn as Lily Barneron (season 2 to 4)

Episodes

Season 1 (2010-2011) 
 Maman trop tôt (1)
 Bienvenue à Valentin ! (2)
 Vive les vacances !  (3)
 C'est la rentrée ! (4)

Season 2 (2012) 
 La famille c'est sacré ! (5)
 La mutation (6)
 La guerre des familles (7)

Season 3 (2013) 
 Un de plus chez les Boissier (8)
 Maman a craqué (9)
 Haut les cœurs ! (10)

Season 4 (2014) 
 N'aie pas peur petite sœur (11)
 Allez maman, t'es la meilleure ! (12)
 Quand maman dérape (13)
 Rendez-moi ma fille (14)
 Ma femme, sa sœur et moi (15)

Season 5 (2015) 
 Quand maman dit stop ! (16)
 Comment lui dire adieu ? (17)
 Jamais sans mes filles ! (18)
 C'est pas gagné ! (19)
 Ça y est, je marie ma fille ! (20)

Season 6 (2016) 
 ¡ Hola mamá ! (21)
 Les risques du métier (22)
 Comment ne pas douter ? (23)
 ¡ Mátame ! (24)
 Une femme de trop (25)

Season 7 (2017) 
 Dimi en danger : partie 1 (26)
 Dimi en danger : partie 2 (27)
 Nous nous sommes tant aimés : partie 1 (28)
 Nous nous sommes tant aimés : partie 2 (29) 
 ¡ Holà papà !: partie 1 (30)
 ¡ Holà papà ! : partie 2 (31)
 Maman, où t'es ? : partie 1 (32)
 Maman, où t'es ? : partie 2 (33)
 Ma belle-mère s'appelle Clem: Partie 1 (34)
 Ma belle-mère s'appelle Clem: Partie 2 (35)

Season 8 (2018) 
 Nouveau départ (36)
Tout pour ma fille (37)
Où est ton père? (38)
Paso doble (39)
Révolution (40)
Question de choix (41)
L'art d'être papa (42)
Secrets de famille (43)
S'il suffisait qu'on s'aime... (44)
Avec ou sans toi! (45)

Season 9 (2019) 

 Du Fait de Ton Absence (46)
 Maman (47)
 Mon Monde S'Écroule (48)
 Je Vais Me Battre (49)
 Garder la Foi (50)
 En Mémoire de Ton Sourire (51)

Season 10 (2020) 

 Je Suis Là (52)
 Mon Amour (53)
 Je Ne Lâcherai Pas (54)
 Ma Bataille (55)
 Pour la Vérité (56)
 Pour Te Sauver (57)

See also 
 List of French television series

External links 
 
 Clem on AlloCiné

2010s French television series
2010 French television series debuts
French drama television series
French-language television shows
Serial drama television series
TF1 television dramas
Television series about teenagers